Paraplotosus butleri, commonly known as the sailfin catfish, is a species of catfish in the family Plotosidae. This fish is found in coastal reefs off northern Australia in the western Indo-Pacific Ocean. It grows up to about 32.5 centimetres (12.8 in) SL.

The sailfin catfish is found in shallow coastal waters to 5 metres depth. Mature adults are completely black.

References 

Plotosidae
Fish of the Indian Ocean
Fish of the Pacific Ocean
Marine fish of Australia
sailfin catfish
Taxa named by Gerald R. Allen